Sporobolus caespitosus is a species of grass in the family Poaceae.
It is endemic to Ascension Island, in the South Atlantic Ocean, where it is known only from the weather side of the Green Mountain area, where it occupies an area of less than 0.5 km2.  It inhabits the vertical and sloping cinder banks of Green Mountain where very few other species are present, and seems to be adapted to the exposed conditions found at these sites.  It is threatened by introduced vegetation and habitat loss.

References

External links
 Ascension Island Government (2015) Sporobolus caespitosus species action plan. In: The Ascension Island Biodiversity Action Plan. Ascension Island Government Conservation Department, Georgetown, Ascension Island

caespitosus
Vulnerable plants
Flora of Ascension Island
Taxonomy articles created by Polbot